The EP is Frank N Dank's fourth album. The album's production is entirely handled by Dutch producers such as I.N.T., Kid Sublime, Wouda, Y’skid and Elsas. The only single of the album is "Clap Hands".

Track listing

Singles

References

External links
Frank-N-Dank Discography with streaming audio

2007 albums
Frank n Dank albums